Dani Busboom Kelly (born May 5, 1985) is a former American indoor volleyball player and current head coach of Louisville Cardinals women's volleyball team.

Early life
Busboom Kelly was raised in Cortland, Nebraska and was a multi-star athlete for Adams Freeman High School, as she carried Freeman to a state volleyball title as a freshman, as well as two state basketball championships, and a gold medal in the Class D 100-meter hurdles.

Playing career
Busboom Kelly played volleyball for the University of Nebraska cornhuskers from 2003–2006, where she played roles as a setter and libero. She was named the Big 12 co-libero of the year and helped her team with the 2006 NCAA Championship as a senior. She concluded her career as one of only two players ranked among the top-10 in Nebraska history in both digs and assists, finishing second on the digs chart with 1,281 and third in career assists with 2,925. Overall, she would help guide Nebraska to a 124–10 record.

Following her playing career with Nebraska, then-head coach Jenny Lang Ping invited her to be on the U.S. national team training roster.

Coaching career

2009–2010: University of Tennessee Assistant Coach

Busboom Kelly was an assistant coach at Tennessee for the 2009 and 2010 seasons. She guided the team’s setters, coordinated travel and equipment needs and ran the school’s volleyball camps.

2011: University of Louisville Assistant Coach
Busboom Kelly spent the 2011 season as an assistant coach at Louisville, where she helped the Cardinals to a 24-9 record and a trip to the second round of the NCAA tournament.

2012–2016: University of Nebraska Assistant Coach

Busboom Kelly joined Nebraska's coaching staff in 2012, where she would spend five seasons as an assistant coach for her alma mater. She became one of few coaches who won the Division I NCAA title as a player and a coach, as Nebraska would win the 2015 NCAA Championship.

2017–present: University of Louisville Head Coach

In her first season as head coach at Louisville in 2017, she led the Cardinals to the ACC championship, going 18-2 in the league, despite being chosen as eighth place in conference pre-season polls. Busboom Kelly received her first major national award as a head coach when she was named AVCA East Region Coach of the Year. In 2019, Busboom Kelly led the Cardinals to their best NCAA tournament finish in program history, as they advanced to the NCAA Regional finals after upsetting Texas in the Sweet Sixteen.

In 2020, Busboom Kelly led Louisville to another ACC Championship and led the nation in blocks per set and lead the league in opponent hitting percentage. Louisville also ranked among the top five in the ACC in hitting percentage (second, .285), kills per set (second, 14.08) and assists per set (12.58). Busboom was named ACC Coach of the Year as well as AVCA East Region Coach of the Year. In 2021, Busboom Kelly led Louisville to its most successful season in school history: Louisville went undefeated in the regular season, they reached a school history high No.1 national ranking in the coaches poll and reached their first NCAA Final Four in school history. As a result of Louisville's successful season, Busboom Kelly was named the ACC Coach of the Year, AVCA National Coach of the Year and Volleyball Magazine National Coach of the Year.

Awards

Player
Nebraska Single-Season Record Holder (580 Digs in 2006)
2006 Big 12 co-Libero of the Year 
2004 Honorable-Mention AVCA All-Central Region

Coach
2022 ACC Coach of the Year

2022 AVCA East Region Coach of the Year 
2021 Volleyball Magazine National Coach of the Year
2021 AVCA National Coach of the Year
2021 AVCA East Region Coach of the Year
2021 ACC Coach of the Year
2020 AVCA East Region Coach of the Year
2020 ACC Coach of the Year
2017 AVCA East Region Coach of the Year

Head coaching record

External links
 Nebraska Volleyball Profile

References

1985 births
Living people
American volleyball coaches
Sportspeople from Nebraska
Nebraska Cornhuskers women's volleyball players
Nebraska Cornhuskers women's volleyball coaches
Tennessee Volunteers women's volleyball
Louisville Cardinals women's volleyball coaches
Setters (volleyball)
Liberos
American women's volleyball players